Irving "Irv" Bemoras (November 18, 1930 – November 1, 2007) was an American basketball player.

He played collegiately for the University of Illinois at Urbana–Champaign, where he was voted as one of the top 100 players of all time.

He was selected by the Milwaukee Hawks in the 1953 NBA draft.

He played for the Hawks (1953–54) and the St. Louis Hawks (1956–57) in the NBA for 131 games.

He is a member of the Chicagoland Sports Hall of Fame.

Family 
Irv Bemoras and Sally, his wife and life partner for over 50 years, had three children and six grandchildren.

References

External links

1930 births
2007 deaths
All-American college men's basketball players
Basketball players from Chicago
Illinois Fighting Illini men's basketball players
Jewish American sportspeople
Jewish men's basketball players
Milwaukee Hawks draft picks
Milwaukee Hawks players
St. Louis Hawks players
American men's basketball players
Forwards (basketball)
Guards (basketball)
Death in Illinois
20th-century American Jews
21st-century American Jews